Esperley Lane Ends is a village in County Durham, in England. It is situated a few miles to the north west of Darlington, between Cockfield and Evenwood.

References

Villages in County Durham
Cockfield, County Durham